Censorship in Taiwan was greatly relaxed when the state moved away from authoritarianism in 1987. Since then, the media has generally been allowed to broadcast political opposition. Today, the focus of censorship is slander and libel, cross-Strait relations, and national security.

History

Japanese period
In 1936 the Japanese authorities prohibited Lee Shih-chiao from exhibiting his painting Reclining Nude (橫臥裸婦) at the Taiyang Art Exhibition on the basis of indecency. This instigated widespread protest from the Taiwanese art community as comparable works by western artists were held by Japanese and Taiwanese museums.

Republic of China period
In 1941, during the Second Sino-Japanese War, the second volume of the book "Inside Asia", by John Gunther, was prohibited and censored by the Chinese government.

After Taiwan was handed over the Kuomintang-led Republic of China (ROC) from Japan in 1945 and the start of the 38 year martial law period, the ROC, as an authoritarian state, exercised strict control of the media.  Parties other than the Kuomintang, such as the Chinese Youth Party and China Democratic Socialist Party, were banned and media advocating either democracy or Taiwan independence was banned. Li Ao, a famous political activist in Taiwan, nationalist, and intellectual, had over 96 books banned from sale. Writer Bo Yang was jailed for eight years for his translation of the cartoon Popeye because the translation was interpreted as a criticism of leader Chiang Kai-shek.  Taiwanese-language media was also banned, and children who spoke Taiwanese in school were physically punished. The revision of Criminal Acts against seditious speech in 1992 ended the persecution of political opponents.

Musician Wen Hsia became known as the "king of banned songs" due to having more than 100 songs banned by the KMT authorities.

Post-democratisation
Censorship laws remain in place as applicable to the Taiwan Area, but are not enforced with the former rigour. The main areas of censorship, or alleged censorship, occur in the realms of politics, cross-Strait relations, and national security. The principal organs of censorship are the National Communications Commission (NCC) and former Government Information Office (GIO). The formerly murky lines of control exercised by the government over the media through party-ownership of media assets during the Kuomintang era have now been resolved by the progressive divestiture of such assets by the Kuomintang under sustained pressure from the Democratic Progressive Party.

Political censorship in Taiwan
Laws governing elections and politics restrict the publication and broadcasting of political material. For example, in the local elections of 2005, CDs with videos ridiculing candidates were confiscated in accordance to the Election and Recall Act. Laws prohibiting the promotion of Communism has already abolished in 2011. For example, Taiwan Communist Party obtaining registration as a political party in 2008, and become the 141st registered party in Taiwan.

More covert moves have also been made by the government to censor unfavorable media. In 2006 under Democratic Progressive Party (DPP) administration, the independent National Communications Commission (NCC) refused to renew the broadcasting licenses of certain television channels suggesting that the broadcasters were not in compliance with broadcasting standards.

Publication censorship in Taiwan 
During the martial law period the KMT, as an authoritarian state, exercised strict control of publication. Distribution of political manifestos and documents other than those from the KMT, Chinese Youth Party and China Democratic Socialist Party, were banned and publications advocating either democracy or Taiwan independence were banned. The  KMT  found  that  one  of  the causes  leading  to  the  failure  of  the  fight  against  the  communists  was  the  policy regarding literary and artistic work. It was then decided to start book-ban to control the thinking  of  the  people—not  only  were  the  books  on  communism  banned  but those which echoed similar ideas and whose authors stayed in communist region. Publications were strictly managed by the Taiwan Garrison Command and regulated by the Publication Control Act (出版物管制辦法) during the martial law era.
Books that bore the name of Karl Marx were suppressed, as well as works by other authors whose names began with an "M," such as Max Weber and Mark Twain, because in Mandarin their first names sounded similar to Marx. While this has become a joke today, it was a real manifestation of the thought control at the time.
Universities became a hotbed for communist study groups and the KMT recognized that university campuses were places of open ideas and thought and would hire student informants in classes to inform the Garrison Command of any students discussing issues that may be seen as a threat to the KMT. Some illegal communist publications remained in the archives and back shelves of some University libraries and the books would bear a stamp declaring the book and its content as an order of arrest. The publishing ban also affected teaching materials for modern Chinese literature and foreign literature. Renowned Chinese writers, such as Lu Xun, Ba Jin and Lao She were banned, and the law extended to foreign literature they translated, such as those by Ivan Turgenev, Emily Brontë or Émile Zola.
Li Ao, a famous political activist in Taiwan, nationalist, and intellectual, had over 96 books banned from sale. Writer Bo Yang was jailed for eight years for his translation of the cartoon Popeye because the translation was interpreted as a criticism of leader Chiang Kai-shek and in June 1952 the student of national Taiwan University of archeology Ch'iu Yen-Liang was arrested by the Garrison command of KMT and sentenced to six years imprisonment for alleged membership of a marxist study group.

"Only those who lived through the martial law era know how important freedom and democracy are," said , a professor of history at Shih Hsin University.

Lee knew first-hand what life was like during the martial law era. One of Lee's books, The Confession of a Defector (叛徒的告白), was banned by the authorities on the grounds that it "sabotaged the credibility of the government," "instigated dissension between the government and the people," "violated the basic national policy," "confused public opinion" and "damaged popular sentiments."

Lee said he felt that the ban was "ridiculous" because the book was a collection of articles he had already published in newspapers. The books were recalled a few months after hitting the shelves. A magazine he co-founded in 1979, called the 80s, encountered a similar fate. The magazines were confiscated and he was ordered to stop publication for a year. To keep the magazine going, Lee and his cohorts obtained another license for a magazine which went under a different name, the Asian.When the Asian was also ordered to cease publication, they acquired another license for the magazine, this time under the name Current. All publications had to obtain government licenses, and from 1951 to 1988, the authorities limited the number of licenses available for publishing daily newspapers to 31, with the number of pages in each paper also subject to a legal limit (first eight and then 12 pages). This was supposedly due to a "paper shortage." During this period, many of the newspapers were directly owned by the government, the military, or the KMT. Private newspaper publisher were usually KMT members. The only paper to feature occasional moderate criticisms of the government (along with some of the best news reporting) was the Independence Evening Post. The publication was the first to send journalists to China four months after the lifting of martial law, despite government opposition. The authorities continually refused to allow it to publish for the more lucrative morning market until 1988.

Since the lifting of martial law, censorship has declined but has not vanished. Lively new magazines have appeared on the scene, notably The Journalist, which has featured in-depth coverage of politics and social issues combined with editorial criticism of both the government and the opposition. The authorities continue to suppress printed discussion of Taiwan independence, military corruption, and the involvement of the military in politics, and to subject people who write about these topics to prison terms. In January 1988, a year after the lifting of martial law the authority lifted the ban on new newspapers and increased the page limit to 32. Since then, the government has issued over 200 licenses, and 50 papers are actually publishing. Like the magazines, papers have become much bolder in their willingness to publish investigative and analytical articles, as well as editorials criticizing government policy. Some independent newspapers including The Common Daily, The Independent Post, and The Liberty Times have become more critical in their editorial stance. However, the staunchly pro-KMT China Times and United Daily continue to dominate the market, with the other papers competing to serve as reader's second newspaper. Total circulation of all dailies is nearly six million copies. The authorities have also liberalized their past ban on reprinting materials from the mainland, and their suppression of publication styles used there.
In  2007 during the 20th anniversary of the end of Taiwan's martial law, local newspapers allotted substantial space to coverage of culture and society in the martial-law era, paying particular attention to the ban on books, popular songs and the publication of newspapers. Books suppressed from the 1950s to 1980s and several banned songs were part of an exhibition, organized by the Ministry of Education and the National Central Library as one of the events commemorating the martial-law era, which officially ended 15 July 1987. Visitors to the opening included President Chen Shui-bian and Vice President Annette Lu, whose books had been on the banned list during the 1970s and 1980s, the Chinese-language Liberty Times reported July 15.
Around 180 books, 32 magazines and collections of news footage were displayed at the exhibition. The first item shown to the public was a bibliography compiled by the TGC, which contained more than 2,400 titles. Banned books invariably sold well underground, however. One example was "A Taste of Freedom," the memoir by Peng Ming-min, a prominent dissident. Peng's book sold so many copies it could have helped fund the election campaigns of candidates who opposed the KMT at the time, wrote Tsai Sheng-chi, a researcher at the Academia Historica, in the exhibition brochure.

Music and performance censorship in Taiwan 
Many songs, both Chinese and Taiwanese, were banned during the martial law era. Teresa Teng's popular Chinese song "When Will You Return?" (何日君再來) was banned because the authorities considered the Chinese word "you" (君) -- pronounced jun in Mandarin—was a reference to the Communists liberation "army" (軍), which has the same pronunciation. Yao Su-ron's (姚蘇蓉) The Breaker of a Pure Heart (負心的人) was not only banned, Yao was arrested on stage before she could start to sing it. Dubbed the "queen of banned songs," Yao had about 80 or 90 songs banned.
Wen Shia (文夏) was touted the "king of banned songs." Nearly 100 of his songs were banned. Taiwanese songs with titles such as Mending the Net (補破網), Sentimental Memories (舊情綿綿) and Mama, I Am Brave (媽媽我也真勇健) were thought to "corrode military morale," "reflect the plight of the people" and "create nostalgia for life in mainland China."
Official statistics show that more than 930 songs were banned from 1979 to 1987. Among the 10 reasons given by the authorities for banning songs were that they promoted left-wing ideology, reflected Communist propaganda, corroded popular sentiments and endangered the physical and mental health of youth.
The censorship on music also included a ban on all public performance and dance under the freedom of assembly Act, another justification for this was that the message of live music could not be regulated. During the early 80s the first progressive rock band formed called the Typhoons (originally called Vespers) the band members were western expats who were studying Mandarin at the time and would regularly hold illegal performances in and around Taipei. The performances would be self advertised with homemade posters and during the performances friends would stand outside checking for the Garrison Command, if they were seen the band would be signaled and the performance would stop momentarily and anyone dancing would immediately sit down.

The strict media censorship in Taiwan, originated from China. These bans include anything time-travel related, Winnie the Pooh, and tightly implemented restrictions on social media.

Cross Strait relations

The use of overt and covert censorship in relation to mainland China and the People's Republic of China is an active area of controversy. For example, satellite channels perceived to adopt a pro-PRC or pro-unification editorial stance, such as Phoenix TV, were refused landing rights in Taiwan by the DPP-controlled government. Similarly, correspondent offices representing the PRC government-controlled Xinhua News Agency and the People's Daily were closed by the DPP-controlled government. These policies were reversed after the election of the Kuomintang in 2008.

Internet censorship in Taiwan

According to a survey conducted by Taiwan's Institute for Information Industry, an NGO, 81.8% of households had access to the Internet at the end of 2011.

The constitution provides for freedom of speech and press, and the authorities generally respect these rights in practice. An independent press, an effective judiciary, and a functioning democratic political system combine to protect freedom of speech and press. There are no official restrictions on access to the Internet or credible reports that the authorities monitor e-mail or Internet chat rooms without judicial oversight.

The websites of PRC institutions such as the Chinese Communist Party, People's Daily and China Central Television can be freely accessed from Taiwan.

Future of censorship in Taiwan
The authority for censorship in Taiwan since 2006 is the National Communications Commission (NCC). On 26 June 2006 news reports said that a review by the Council of Grand Justices of the ROC found that part of the National Communications Commission Organization Act (e.g. Article 4) is unconstitutional, and that after 31 December 2008 the law provision is invalid.

See also
 Censorship in Japan
 Cinema of Taiwan
 Human rights in Taiwan
 Kaohsiung Incident
 Propaganda in the Republic of China

References

External links
 "Taiwan", Freedom in the World 2013, Freedom House.
Reporters Without Borders Annual Reports on Taiwan
 2002
 2003
 2004
 2006
 2007

International Freedom of Expression Exchange
 "Taiwan highlights"
 , 2 February 2007.